Timecode is a Spanish live-action short film directed by Juanjo Giménez. It won the Short Film Palme d'Or award at 69th annual Cannes Film Festival in 2016. It is also nominated for an Academy Award for Best Live Action Short Film at the 89th Academy Awards in 2017.

Plot
Luna and Diego are car park security guards. Diego does the night shift, and Luna works by day. One day, Luna's boss asks her to investigate a broken tail light.

Cast
 Lali Ayguadé as Luna	
 Nicolas Ricchini as Diego
 Pep Domenech 	
 Vicente Gil

Awards and nominations
 Nominated: Academy Award for Best Live Action Short Film 
 Won: Goya Award for Best Fictional Short Film 
 Won: Short Film Palme d'Or
 Won: Bunter Hund – Internationales Kurzfilmfest München

References

External links
 
 

2016 films
2010s Spanish-language films
2016 drama films
2016 short films
Films set in 2016
Spanish drama films
Spanish short films
2010s Spanish films